The Mnt internal ribosome entry site (IRES) is an RNA element. Mnt is a transcriptional repressor related to the Myc/Mad family of transcription factors. It is thought that this IRES allows efficient Mnt synthesis when cap-dependent translation initiation is reduced.

See also 
N-myc IRES
Tobamovirus IRES
TrkB IRES

References

External links 
 

Cis-regulatory RNA elements